This is a list of films based on manga. It includes films that are adaptations of manga, and those films whose characters originated in those comics.

See also

List of films based on English-language comics
List of films based on French-language comics

Also related:
List of fiction works made into feature films, the other popular source for Japanese films
List of films based on comic strips
List of comic-based films directed by women
List of films based on television programs, features anime that appeared as TV series
List of manga

References